Syed Shah Isra'il, also known as Shah Bondegi (lit. King of Worship), was a 16th-century Persian language writer from Bengal. He is celebrated as a renowned medieval author of the Sylhet region.

Background
Syed Israil was born into the aristocratic Bengali Muslim Syed family who were the landowners of Taraf, a renowned literary centre of learning in the eastern part of the Bengal Sultanate. His father was Syed Khudawand, the son of Syed Musafir - who was the son of Syed Sirajuddin, the son of Sipahsalar Syed Nasiruddin. Israil was the second son; his older brother being Syed Mikail and his younger brother being Syed Bondegi Saif.

Life
Famed for his high proficiency in the Arabic and Persian languages, he wrote Ma'dan al-Fawa'id (Mine of Benefits) in 941 AH (1534 AD). This is the earliest book in the Sylhet region, and thus Israil is considered Sylhet's first author. He was awarded the title of Malik al-Ulama (king of scholars), just like his uncle Syed Ibrahim.

Israil had 12 sons; Syed Hemad, Syed Taj Jalali, Syed Ismail (Chhoto Miah), Syed Abdullah Thani (Mezu Miah), Syed Ibrahim, Syed Muhammad, Syed Abdullah Muhammad, Syed Yaqub Faqirabadi, Syed Ilyas Quddus (Qutb al-Awlia), Syed Kamal, Syed Nuh and Syed Qutb.

References

People from Chunarughat Upazila
Bengali writers
16th-century Persian-language writers
16th-century male writers
16th-century Muslim scholars of Islam
16th-century Indian Muslims
16th-century Indian scholars
16th-century educators
16th-century deaths
16th-century nobility
16th-century Islamic religious leaders
16th-century Bengalis